The 1972 Football Cup of Ukrainian SSR among KFK  was the annual season of Ukraine's football knockout competition for amateur football teams.

Competition schedule

Preliminary round

|}
Notes:

First qualification round
August 19

|}
Notes:

Second qualification round
August 26

|}
Notes:

Quarterfinals (1/4)
September 24

|}

Semifinals (1/2)

|}

Final
October 15

|}

See also
 1972 KFK competitions (Ukraine)

External links
 (1972 - 34 чемпионат СССР Кубок Украинской ССР среди КФК) at footbook.ru

Ukrainian Amateur Cup
Ukrainian Amateur Cup
Amateur Cup